Sheilabai Bappoo (born Rama on 16 June 1947 in Beau Bassin, Mauritius) is a Mauritius politician, Minister of Social Security, National Solidarity and Senior Citizens Welfare & Reform Institutions in Mauritius from 2005 to 2010. She also held the ministry of Gender Equality, Child Protection and Family Planning from 1983 to 1995 and from 2010 to 2011.

Biography 

Sheila Bappoo completed her graduation in teaching from Queen Elizabeth College. She was a teacher until 1977.

She was a leader of the Mauritian Militant Movement and was General-Secretary of the party until 1975. She decided to step down in favor of Anerood Jugnauth, who went on to become the President. Bapoo was elected councilor of Beau-Bassin & Rose-Hill where she was appointed as Deputy Mayor in 1977.

The split in her party created a rift between the new Prime Minister Anerood Jugnauth and the leader of the party Berenger. In 1983 they finally announced the termination of their alliance. Jugnauth proposed the creation of a new party sister to the MMM with the members who disagreed with Berenger, one of them was Bappoo. She finally merged with Jugnauth in the new party called the Militant Socialist Movement (MSM). The party won the elections of 1983. Jugnauth remained Prime Minister with a new team along with Bappoo as Minister of Women's Right.

In 1996 Rama Sithanen, Alain Laridon and Sheila Bappoo formed a new party named Rally for Reform or Rassemblement Pour la Réforme (RPR). The RPR allied with PMSD for the municipal elections, going on to win 25% of the votes. From 1991 to 1995, she served as the Minister for Women's Rights, Child Development and Family Welfare.

She joined MSM in 2003 and subsequently served as the Minister of Labour and Industrial Relations and Women's Rights, Child Development and Family Welfare.  She was elected again in Constituency No 16 as from July 2005 to date, under the banner of Labour Party, Social Alliance.

At the 2005 elections she was candidate for the Labour Party (Mauritius) with the Alliance Sociale coalition Alliance Sociale (PTR–PMXD–LVF–MR–MMSM) and was elected at Constituency No. 16. At the subsequent elections in 2010 she was again elected in the same Constituency under the banner of Labour Party (coalition of PTR-PMSD-MSM). From July 2005 to 11 May 2010, she held the ministry of Social Security, National Solidarity and Senior Citizens Welfare & Reform Institutions. Her portfolio was changed to Gender Equality, Child Development and Family Welfare on 11 May 2010 and she continued till 7 August 2011. 

On 18 August 2011, she became the Minister of Social Security, National Solidarity and Reforms Institutions Welfare.

On 15 March 2015, Sheila Bappoo withdrew from politics.

Awards 
 2007: Grand Officer of the Order of the Star and Key of the Indian Ocean and set eligible to use post-nominal (GOSK).

References

External links

 Official biography

Members of the National Assembly (Mauritius)
Living people
Government ministers of Mauritius
Mauritian Hindus
Militant Socialist Movement politicians
Labour Party (Mauritius) politicians
Grand Officers of the Order of the Star and Key of the Indian Ocean
1947 births
Women government ministers of Mauritius
20th-century women politicians
21st-century women politicians
People from Plaines Wilhems District
Mauritian politicians of Indian descent